Naoto Kojima  is a Japanese mixed martial artist. He competed in the Featherweight division.

Mixed martial arts record

|-
| Draw
| align=center| 1-5-1
| Fumio Usami
| Draw
| Shooto: Gig East 11
| 
| align=center| 2
| align=center| 5:00
| Tokyo, Japan
| 
|-
| Loss
| align=center| 1-5
| Mitsuhiro Ishida
| TKO (punches)
| Shooto: Gig East 7
| 
| align=center| 2
| align=center| 1:58
| Tokyo, Japan
| 
|-
| Win
| align=center| 1-4
| Naoki Matsushita
| Decision (unanimous)
| Shooto: Gig East 5
| 
| align=center| 2
| align=center| 5:00
| Tokyo, Japan
| 
|-
| Loss
| align=center| 0-4
| Hiroki Kotani
| Submission (heel hook)
| Lumax Cup: Tournament of J '97 Lightweight Tournament
| 
| align=center| 1
| align=center| 1:10
| Japan
| 
|-
| Loss
| align=center| 0-3
| Takenori Ito
| Decision (majority)
| Shooto: Reconquista 4
| 
| align=center| 2
| align=center| 5:00
| Tokyo, Japan
| 
|-
| Loss
| align=center| 0-2
| Takuya Kuwabara
| Decision (majority)
| Shooto: Free Fight Kawasaki
| 
| align=center| 3
| align=center| 3:00
| Kawasaki, Kanagawa, Japan
| 
|-
| Loss
| align=center| 0-1
| Jutaro Nakao
| Submission (rear-naked choke)
| Shooto: Vale Tudo Junction 2
| 
| align=center| 2
| align=center| 1:42
| Tokyo, Japan
|

See also
List of male mixed martial artists

References

External links
 
 Naoto Kojima at mixedmartialarts.com

Japanese male mixed martial artists
Featherweight mixed martial artists
Living people
Year of birth missing (living people)